Horace George Drane (15 February 1881 – 29 September 1965) was an Australian rules footballer who played with Melbourne and South Melbourne in the Victorian Football League (VFL). He was described as "a fine running player".

Drane took a while to establish himself at Melbourne, playing just twice in 1902 and no senior football in 1903. He then played regularly over the next three years before crossing to South Melbourne for the 1907 VFL season.

He was a member of South Melbourne's 1909 premiership team. Although he had played only once all year, in round 14, Drane was the beneficiary of Jim Caldwell's suspension and replaced him on the wing for the 1909 Grand Final. The 1909 Grand Final was his last VFL match.

References

External links

 

1881 births
Australian rules footballers from Melbourne
Melbourne Football Club players
Sydney Swans players
Sydney Swans Premiership players
Leopold Football Club (MJFA) players
1965 deaths
One-time VFL/AFL Premiership players
People from Albert Park, Victoria